Jalan Raja Muda Abdul Aziz (formerly Princes Road) is a major road in Kuala Lumpur, Malaysia. It was built in 1990 and named after Tengku Abdul Aziz Shah (Sultan Salahuddin Abdul Aziz Shah), a former Raja Muda of Selangor.

List of junctions

Roads in Kuala Lumpur